Etchegaray is a surname. Notable people with the surname include:

Roger Etchegaray (1922–2019), French cardinal
Etchegaray (pelotari), French sportsman who competed at the 1900 Summer Olympics in Paris

See also
Echegaray

Basque-language surnames